Lellos Demetriades (3 February 1933 – 9 April 2022) was a Cypriot politician. A member of the Patriotic Front, he served as mayor of Nicosia Municipality from 1971 to 2001. He died on 9 April 2022.

References

1933 births
2022 deaths
20th-century Cypriot politicians
21st-century Cypriot politicians
Greek Cypriot politicians
Members of the House of Representatives (Cyprus)
People from Nicosia